Hubert James Ryburn  (19 April 1897 – 30 June 1988) was a notable New Zealand Presbyterian minister and university college master. He was born in Gisborne, New Zealand, on 19 April 1897.

In the 1959 Queen's Birthday Honours, Ryburn was appointed a Companion of the Order of St Michael and St George.

References

1897 births
1988 deaths
New Zealand Presbyterians
People from Gisborne, New Zealand
New Zealand Companions of the Order of St Michael and St George
Chancellors of the University of Otago